is a Japanese singer, songwriter and actor. In 2001, he debuted as a singer with "I Will Get Your Kiss". In 2002, he appeared in the musical Mozart!, in which he played the leading role and received a Rookie of the Year Award in the drama division at the 57th National Arts Festival held by the Agency of Cultural Affairs, Government of Japan. His performance in the same musical also earned him the Haruko Sugimura Award
and an award nomination for best actor in the 10th Yomiuri Drama Awards. Since then, he has performed in a number of musicals while still actively pursuing his musical career.

Biography

Early life
Akinori Nakagawa was born in 1982 and raised in Sendai, Miyagi. He began to learn classical piano while in kindergarten.

In 1997, he participated a music contest named "Teens Music Festival" hosted by Yamaha in Tohoku region and he became the youngest prize winner. He would have advanced the National contest, but the song he sang was not his own song, so he could not enter it. In 1998, he participated the contest with his sister again and he advanced to the National contest and took a second place of the contest.

Music career
Akinori Nakagawa and his sister's appearance on the TV documentary program was decided after the parent of his classmate, TV producer, watched his and his sister singing songs at the school festival.

On 1 August 2001, Akinori Nakagawa debuted with his first single, "I Will Get Your Kiss". The song was used as the theme song in the Japanese TV drama Maria, and sold over 200,000 copies.
In 2004, he made his album debut in Taiwan.

Discography

Studio albums

Compilation albums

Soundtracks (Cast recording)

Singles

Music videos

DVDs (Live on stage DVD)

Tours and concerts

Works

Stage

Television

Awards and nominations

Awards
 All Japan Request Awards – New artist of the year – "I Will Get Your Kiss"
 National Arts Festival Award for Rookie of the Year in the drama division – Mozart!
 Haruko Sugimura Award in a Musical – Mozart!
 Yomiuri Drama Awards in a Musical  – Mozart!

References

External links
 Official website 
 Official blog 
 [ Akinori Nakagawa] at Allmusic
 Akinori Nakagawa at Billboard

Japanese male singer-songwriters
Japanese singer-songwriters
1982 births
Living people
Actors from Miyagi Prefecture
Musicians from Miyagi Prefecture
21st-century Japanese singers
21st-century Japanese male singers